Veeraana is a 2010 drama film directed by Yoosuf Shafeeu. Co-produced by Mohamed Abdulla and Fathimath Nahula under Dhekedheke Ves Production and Crytsal Entertainment, the film stars Yoosuf Shafeeu, Niuma Mohamed and Amira Ismail in pivotal roles. The film was released on 28 May 2010.

Plot
Reena (Niuma Mohamed) and Saajila (Amira Ismail) meets Shahin (Yoosuf Shafeeu) at a masquerade ball and he falls in love with Reena. Meanwhile, Saajila expresses her admirance towards a person she met at the same party. Reena agreed to be friends with Shahin on a condition; he should never love her in any circumstances. However Shahin expresses his endearment towards Reena. She shared the incidence with Saajila and she talked her out of it. Reena divulged that she has an artificial pacemaker inserted to her body and she wants to spend the rest of her life with no strain. It was revealed that she has a valve leak in her nervous system and she is advice to refrain from being involved in any exhausting work.

Shahin and Reena marries while Saajila departs to Australia to complete a course of three years. Reena died during childbirth. Before her death, she adjured Reena to marry Shahin when she passes away. Reena begged to differ, till she finds a photograph of Shahin; whom she liked during the party. Witnessing her affection towards his daughter Zeena (Aminath Samiya), Shahin proposed Saajila for marriage. Shahin and Saajila marries and lives in an island with Zeena and Saajila's uncle Habeeb (Ali Firaq).

Habeeb heard two men talking about Zeena, infusing his mind with sexual excitement. Shahin got a job from a private company and decided to settle in Male' for a while. One day, when Saajila went for parent teacher's meeting, Habeeb sexually abused nine years old Zeena, threatening her to kill her father if she reveals the truth to him. Noticing a change in her behavior, Saajila discovered her uncle sexual assaulting her step-daughter. Unsure of its aftermath, Saajila decided to hide the truth from Shahin. Seeing bruises on Zeena's leg Shahin questions her, but she lies it as an injury during a fall. One night, Shahin saw Habeeb coming out of Zeena's toilet and was disturbed by it. The other day, Saajila found him moving out of Zeena's room and attacks her uncle. He pushed her to the wall and escapes.

The following night, Shahin decided to discuss the reasons for Zeena's idle life with Habeeb and was distraught to see bruises on his back. Suspicious of events, Shahin went to Zeena's room, where he saw Habeeb's watch on the floor. Shahin discovered the truth; Habeeb has been sexually abusing Zeena for over two years. Enraged, Shahin stabbed Habeeb on road and murdered him. He dragged Habeeb's body to Atoll's Office and surrenders.

Cast 
 Yoosuf Shafeeu as Shahin
 Amira Ismail as Saajila
 Niuma Mohamed as Reena
 Ali Firaq as Habeeb
 Aminath Samiya as Zeena
 Hamdhan Farooq as school supervisor (Special appearance)
 Ahmed Nimal as government official (Special appearance)
 Ahmed Saeed as government official (Special appearance)
 Mohamed Faisal  as Reena's friend (Special appearance)
 Koyya Hassan Manik as Shahin's boss (Special appearance)

Soundtrack

Accolades

References

2010 films
Maldivian drama films
Films directed by Yoosuf Shafeeu
2010 drama films
Dhivehi-language films